This list of schools of pharmacy in the United Kingdom includes all thirty GPhC or PSNI  registered MPharm degree-issuing schools of pharmacy in the United Kingdom. There are twenty-six such schools in England, two in Scotland, one in Wales and two in Northern Ireland.

England

Scotland
Robert Gordon University - School of Pharmacy & Life Sciences 
University of Strathclyde - Strathclyde Institute of Pharmacy and Biomedical Sciences

Wales
Cardiff University - Welsh School of Pharmacy

Northern Ireland
Queen's University Belfast - School of Pharmacy 
University of Ulster (Coleraine) - Department of Pharmacy and Pharmaceutical Sciences

See also
List of pharmacy schools
List of universities in the United Kingdom
List of pharmacy organizations in the United Kingdom
List of medical schools in the United Kingdom
List of dental schools in the United Kingdom
Royal Pharmaceutical Society of Great Britain

Notes and references

Pharmacy
United Kingdom